Monika Lövgren is a Swedish politician and member of the Riksdag for the Sweden Democrats party. She was appointed to parliament, succeeding Paula Bieler who had resigned her seat, and took over Bieler's role as the SD's spokeswoman on equality, gender and LGBT issues.

References 

Living people
1961 births
Members of the Riksdag 2018–2022
Members of the Riksdag from the Sweden Democrats
Women members of the Riksdag
21st-century Swedish women politicians